The Sharp-Page House is a historic house in Columbus, Ohio, United States. The house was built c. 1889 and was listed on the National Register of Historic Places in 1986. The Sharp-Page House was built at a time when East Broad Street was a tree-lined avenue featuring the most ornate houses in Columbus; the house reflects the character of the area at the time. The building is also part of the 18th & E. Broad Historic District on the Columbus Register of Historic Properties, added to the register in 1988.

See also
 National Register of Historic Places listings in Columbus, Ohio

References

Houses completed in 1912
National Register of Historic Places in Columbus, Ohio
Houses in Columbus, Ohio
Houses on the National Register of Historic Places in Ohio
Columbus Register properties
Queen Anne architecture in Ohio
Broad Street (Columbus, Ohio)